Ivy Baldwin (born William Ivy July 31, 1866 – October 8, 1953, in Houston, Texas, he changed his name in later years to Ivy Baldwin so that he and his partner, Thomas Scott Baldwin, could be billed as "The Baldwin Brothers".
 Ivy Baldwin was an American balloonist, aeronaut and high-wire performer. He is credited with being the first aviator to be shot down during wartime in the U.S. during the Spanish–American War.

Biography 
In 1877 he performed in Thayer Dollar Circus as a tightrope walker. He later joined with Thomas and Sam Baldwin—billed as "The Baldwin Brothers"—performing high wire acts as well as balloon ascensions and parachuting. The Baldwin Brothers performed using handmade balloons filled with hot air which would ascend to 2500 feet as Ivy Baldwin performed acrobatics and would parachute to the ground. He became a solo performer in 1893 and joined the U.S. Army Signal Corps the following year as a Sergeant in the position of piloting and maintaining their demonstration balloon.

From 1890 to 1907 Baldwin spent many summers at Elitch Gardens where he made balloon ascents on Saturdays and Sundays, sometimes performing stunts on a trapeze as he ascended. "In 1902, for the first time, Ivy Baldwin parachuted to the earth from the balloon.  Mary Elitch Long, the owner of the gardens, was quoted as saying: "Mr. Long and I were the first passengers to soar into the Colorado sky. I must confess there were some apprehensive gasps as the starting whistle blew, but our fears soon gave place to a feeling of power and security as we ascended... From the great height of fifteen hundred feet, all Denver and its environs of mountains and plains lay spread before our entranced vision."

In 1898 he was the pilot of the hot air balloon that gave U.S. troops location information of Spanish snipers before the Battle of San Juan Hill. The balloon was shot down on June 30, 1898, and landed in the Aguadores River. Baldwin was later honourably discharged and he took fragments of the balloon with him which he would sell when he performed, dubbing himself "the air hero of the late War". He celebrated his eighty-second birthday by tightrope walking 125 feet above a canyon formed by the South Boulder Creek in Colorado, a crossing he'd made 80 times in 40 years.

Ivy Baldwin lived many years in Eldorado Canyon, in Boulder County, Colorado, where he died, not in a balloon mishap, but in bed, at his home on Oct. 8, 1953, at the age of 87.

Halls of fame
He was the first inductee to the Colorado Aviation Hall of Fame in 1969, along with 9 other early Colorado aviators. They stated that since his early years he had “a sincere urge to get into the air, one way or the other.” The ceremony noted that he was also "the first person to fly a powered 'air craft' in the State of Colorado" since he had made a brief flight "in a self-designed and self-built powered dirigible-type balloon". 

He was selected to be in the Nevada Aerospace Hall of Fame for being "the first person to successfully fly an airplane in the State of Nevada." which he accomplished on June 23, 1910.

See also 
 Original ten 1969 Colorado Aviation Hall of Fame Laureates
 Ivy Baldwin
 Allan F. Bonnalie
 Ira Boyd "Bumps" Humphreys
 Albert E. Humphreys
 Will D. "Billy" Parker
 Chriss J. Peterson
 Reginald Sinclaire
 George W. Thompson
 Frank A. Van Dersarl
 Jerry Cox Vasconcells
 List of current Hall of Fame Laureates

References

External links

 Colorado Aviation Historical Society website
 Airport Journals: Ivy Baldwin Story

Further reading
 Holmes, Charles W., Editor, Honoree Album of the Colorado Aviation Hall of Fame, The Colorado Aviation Historical Society, 1999, Audubon Media Corp., Audubon, IA

Aviation pioneers
Aviators from Texas
American balloonists
1866 births
1953 deaths